The Turn is the second studio album by South African rock band Taxi Violence, released in August 2009.

Track listing

References

2009 albums
Taxi Violence albums